Andrea Dallaway (born 14 October 1970) is a British sprint canoer who competed in the late 1980s. She was eliminated in the semifinals of the K-4 500 m event at the 1988 Summer Olympics in Seoul. Four years later in Barcelona, Dallaway was eliminated in the semifinals of the K-4 500 m event. At her third and final Summer Olympics in Atlanta, she was eliminated in the semifinals of the K-1 500 m event.

References
Sports-reference.com profile

1970 births
Canoeists at the 1988 Summer Olympics
Canoeists at the 1992 Summer Olympics
Canoeists at the 1996 Summer Olympics
Living people
Olympic canoeists of Great Britain
British female canoeists